is a Japanese singer. Her affiliated office in which she belongs to is Ken-On, and her record label is Virgin Music.

Biography
At the age of thirteen, Hanae sent a demo tape to the audition "Great Hunting" of EMI Music Japan. There was a contact from the EMI side and it was told that she does "not have anything right now due to being young on age, but I want you to listen when I can play a song."

On 1 June 2011, Hanae released the single "Hane" from EMI Music Japan, and made her major debut.

On 14 November 2012, her third single "Kamisama hajimemashita / Kamisama Onegai" was released. The song did not use Hanae's own music for the first time. It was instead produced by Shuichi Mabe (ex. Sōtaisei Riron, Shinkō Hōkō Betsu Tsūkō Kubun, Azer & Baejang).

On 27 November 2013, her first album Jikkai Quiz was released.

On 9 February 2014, in commemoration of the release of her first album Hanae went to Harajuku Astro Hall for her first one-man live Hanae 1st One Man Live –Hanae no Jikkai–.

On 30 August 2014, she held an event organized by Shibuya WWW Hanae*Fes 2014 –Natsume no tsume ato Heart.

In December 2012, Hanae was selected in the cover of Shiseido's corporate culture magazine Hana Tsubaki (merger number January/February 2015) which celebrated its 76th anniversary.

Discography

Singles

Albums

Videography
 Music videos

 Tie-ups

Filmography

Anime television

Live

Events

References

External links
Official profiles
 – Universal Music Japan 

Living people
Japanese women pop singers
Japanese women singer-songwriters
Japanese singer-songwriters
Ken-On artists
People from Fukuoka
1994 births
21st-century Japanese singers
21st-century Japanese women singers